The CEV Champions League was the highest level of European club volleyball in the 2011–12 season and the 53rd edition. It ran from 29 November 2011 until 26 March 2012.

Fenerbahçe won the title for the first time, defeating RC Cannes 3–0 in the final.

Teams of the 2011–2012 competition
The number of participants on the basis of ranking list for European Cup Competitions:

 The drawing of lots for the main phase (group stage) of the competition was held on 1 July 2011, in Vienna.

League round
20 teams were drawn to 5 pools of 4 teams each.
The sixteen best teams qualified for the Round of 16.
The four other teams moved to the CEV Cup.

Pool A

Pool B

Pool C

Pool D

Pool E

Knockout stage

Round of 16

1Rabita Baku won the golden set 15–6.

First leg

Second leg

Quarterfinals
In case of a tie - 1 match won and 1 match lost and not depending on the final score of both matches - the teams have to play a golden set to determine which one qualifies for the next round.

1Dinamo Kazan won the golden set 15–10

2Villa Cortese won the golden set 15–11

3RC Cannes won the golden set 18–16

First leg

Second leg

Final four
The final four will be held at Baku, Azerbaijan.

Bracket

Semifinals

Third place game

Final

Final standing

Awards
 MVP:  Kim Yeon-Koung (Fenerbahçe)
 Best Scorer:  Kim Yeon-Koung (Fenerbahçe)
 Best Setter:  Naz Aydemir (Fenerbahçe)
 Best Blocker:  Maria Borisenko (Dinamo Kazan)
 Best Server:  Makare Wilson (Villa Cortese)
 Best Spiker:  Sarah Pavan (Villa Cortese)
 Best Receiver:  Jordan Larson (Dinamo Kazan)
 Best Libero:  Paola Cardullo (RC Cannes)

References

External links 
 Champions League

CEV Women's Champions League
Women's CEV Champions League
Women's CEV Champions League